Andando is the sixth studio album (seventh overall) by Argentine Latin-pop singer-songwriter Diego Torres released on August 8, 2006 through Sony Music.

Album information
He co-wrote and produced all of the album. The album was preceded by the title single "Andando", the second single was "Abriendo Caminos" featuring Dominican singer-songwriter Juan Luis Guerra which peaked at number 30 on the Billboard Top Latin Songs, the third and final was "Hasta Cuándo".

Track listing

Chart performance

Charts

Personnel 

Diego Sánchez - cello
Diego Torres - chorus, rap, didgeridoo, vocals, realization, producer
Luis Mansilla - engineer
Pablo Etcheverry -piano, programming, hammond organ, keyboards
Lucho González - arranger, direction
Gabe Witcher - violin
Afo Verde - guitar, A&R, harmonica
Brigitta Danko - violin
Claudio Divella - photography
David Amaya - flamenco guitar
Magalí Bachor - chorus
Fabían Bertero - violin
Martin Valenzuela - assistant

Jorge Bergero - cello
Rolfi Calahorrano - wind arrangements, arranger, charango, sax, tenor sax, fender rhodes, piano
Luis Cardoso - electronics, programming, nylon string guitar, acoustic guitar
Scott Conrad - production assistant
Juan Escalona - trombone
Fabrizio Lazzaro - executive producer, personal manager
Alexander Batista - transverse flute, chorus
Juan Armani - assistant
Martin Bosa "Tucán" - keyboards, programming
Carlos Goméz - drum technician
Gustavo Borner - mastering, engineer

References

2006 albums
Diego Torres albums
Spanish-language albums
Sony Music Latin albums